Mecopus serrirostris is a species of true weevil family.

Description 

Distribution 
This species occurs only in Papua New Guinea.

References 

 Universal Biological Indexer
 Papua Insects

Baridinae
Beetles described in 1871
Taxa named by Francis Polkinghorne Pascoe